Eucalyptus vesiculosa, commonly known as the Corackerup marlock, is a species of marlock (a small, shrubby tree with a crown extending to near ground level) that is endemic to a small area on the south coast of Western Australia. It has smooth bark, elliptical to egg-shaped leaves, flower buds usually in groups of seven, red flowers and conical fruit.

Description
Eucalyptus vesiculosa is a marlock that typically grows to a height of  but does not form a lignotuber. It has smooth, shiny grey bark that is reddish brown when new. Flowering has been observed in May, September and October and the flowers have red stamens with cream-coloured anthers.

Taxonomy and naming
Eucalyptus vesiculosa was first formally described in 2002 by Ian Brooker and Stephen Hopper in the journal Nuytsia from specimens they collected in 1995 near the Boxwood Hill - Ongerup road. The specific epithet (vesiculosa) is from the Latin word vesiculosus meaning "covered with little blisters", referring to the warty operculum.

Distribution and habitat
Corackerup marlock is only known from two localities near Ongerup where it grows in more or less pure stands.

Conservation status
This eucalypt is classified as "Priority Four" by the Government of Western Australia Department of Parks and Wildlife, meaning that is rare or near threatened.

See also
List of Eucalyptus species

References

Eucalypts of Western Australia
vesiculosa
Myrtales of Australia
Plants described in 2002
Taxa named by Ian Brooker
Taxa named by Stephen Hopper